The 5th Division was one of the divisions of the People's Army of the Republic that were organized during the Spanish Civil War on the basis of the Mixed Brigades. It was deployed on the Madrid and Levante fronts.

History 
The unit was created on 31 December 1936, within the Madrid Army Corps. It covered the second sector of the Madrid front, from the El Pardo wall to the Manzanares river. It had its headquarters in the  Palace of El Pardo. The division was made up of the 5th, 38th and 39th mixed brigades, with 8,166 troops and nine pieces of artillery.

The 5th Division played an important role during the Third Battle of the Corunna Road, defending the accesses to Madrid, the San Fernando Bridge and the El Pardo mountain. Later the unit became part of the II Army Corps, and later in the VI Army Corps, remaining at the Madrid front.

In the spring of 1938, José Miaja sent it to the Levante front to reinforce the republican forces that were resisting the nationalist offensive. The 5th Division, located between the 25th and 39th, maintained its defensive positions and managed to avoid the defeat of the republican units deployed in the Maestrazgo area. The unit maintained the resistance in this area for several weeks, suffering severe wear and tear. Subsequently, the 5th Division went to the XIX Army Corps, standing out in the resistance against the nationalist Army Corps de Navarra in Campillo.

During the rest of the war, it did not take part in relevant military operations.

Command 
Commanders
 Juan Perea Capulino;
 Miguel Palacios Martínez;
 José Penido Iglesias;

Commissars
 Tomás Sanz Asensio, of the CNT;

Chiefs of Staff
 Joaquín Martí Sánchez;
 Francisco Garrido Romero;
 Paulino García Puente;
 Juan Miguel Mari;

Organization

References

Bibliography
 
 
 

 
 
 
 

Military units and formations established in 1936
Military units and formations disestablished in 1939
Divisions of Spain
Military units and formations of the Spanish Civil War
Military history of Spain
Armed Forces of the Second Spanish Republic
1936 establishments in Spain
1939 disestablishments in Spain